2nd Miyakibashevo (2-se Miäkäbaş) is a rural locality (a village) in Miyakibashevsky Selsoviet of Miyakinsky District, Russia. The population was 56 as of 2010.

Geography 
2nd Miyakibashevo is located 20 km northeast of Kirgiz-Miyaki (the district's administrative centre) by road. Mayak is the nearest rural locality.

Ethnicity 
The village is inhabited by Bashkirs and other.

Streets 
 Tsentralnaya

References

External links 
 2nd Miyakibashevo on komandirovka.ru

Rural localities in Miyakinsky District